Clifford Sydney Bastin (14 March 1912 – 4 December 1991) was an English footballer who played as a winger for Exeter City and Arsenal. He also played for the England national team. Bastin is Arsenal's third-highest goalscorer of all time.

Club career
Born in Exeter, Bastin started his career at Exeter City, making his début for the club in 1928, at the age of 16. Despite only playing 17 games and scoring 6 goals in his time at Exeter, he was spotted by Arsenal manager Herbert Chapman in a match against Watford. Chapman was at the game to keep tabs on a Watford player but the 17-year-old Bastin's ability became so evident to him that he decided to sign him at the end of the 1928–29 season.
 
Bastin made his début against Everton on 5 October 1929 and was immediately a first-team regular, making 21 appearances that season. He went on to be a near ever-present in the side over the next decade, playing over 35 matches in every season up to and including 1937–38. His youthful appearance earned him the nickname "Boy Bastin", but despite such, Bastin's play was characterised by a remarkable coolness, and deadly precision in front of goal; he also became Arsenal's regular penalty-taker. Bastin's scoring feats are all the more remarkable considering he played on the left wing rather than as forward. At the time, Arsenal's strategy depended heavily on their wingers cutting into the penalty box with a supply of passes from playmaker Alex James being the source of many goals as well.

With Arsenal, Bastin won the FA Cup twice, in 1929–30 and 1935–36, and the First Division title five times, in 1930–31, 1932–33, 1933–34, 1934–35 and 1937–38. By the age of nineteen Bastin had won a League title, FA Cup and been capped for England, making him the youngest player ever to achieve all three. He played in Arsenal's 2–1 victory over Sheffield Wednesday in the Charity Shield at Stamford Bridge in October 1930. Bastin also finished as Arsenal top scorer in 1932–33 and 1933–34, with 33 and 15 goals respectively. After centre-forward Ted Drake arrived in March 1934, Bastin was no longer Arsenal's primary winger.

With Drake scoring the lion's share of the goals and Alex James increasingly unavailable due to injury and age, Bastin was moved to inside-forward to replace James for much of the 1935–36 season, which saw Arsenal drop to sixth. Bastin still scored 17 goals, including six in Arsenal's run to the 1936 FA Cup Final, which they won 1–0. After a stint at right half to cover for Jack Crayston, Bastin was eventually restored to the left wing to score 17 goals in the 1937–38 title-winning season. An injury to his right leg ruled him out of much of the 1938–39 season, the last one played before the outbreak of the Second World War.

Bastin's tally of 178 goals made him Arsenal's all-time top goalscorer from 1939 until 1997, when his total was surpassed by Ian Wright. In 2005 Thierry Henry passed each player's totals, and so Bastin is Arsenal's third-top goalscorer of all time. His record of 150 league goals for Arsenal stood for slightly longer, being equalled by Henry on 14 January 2006 and surpassed by him in February of the same year.

International career
Bastin made his debut at senior level for England against Wales. This game was played at Anfield on 18 November 1931, which England won by a 3–1 margin. A most noteworthy highlight of his England career was the famous "Battle of Highbury", where England defeated 1934 World Cup winners Italy 3–2. Bastin also featured in a notorious match against Germany in Berlin in 1938, when the England team was ordered to give the Nazi salute before the match. Bastin may have won more caps but at the time faced competition from Eric Brook.

The Second World War intervened when Bastin was 27, thus cutting short what should have been the peak of his career, although his leg injury would probably have done this in any case. Bastin was excused military service as he failed the army hearing test owing to his increasing deafness. Thus, during the war, he served as an ARP Warden, being stationed on top of Highbury stadium with Tom Whittaker. He also played matches in the war-time league to boost civilian morale. In 1941, Fascist Italy's propaganda broadcast on Rome Radio, contained a bizarre claim that Bastin had been captured in the Battle of Crete, and was being detained in Italy. The Italians were unaware that Bastin was deaf and had been excused service.

Bastin's injured leg had hampered his performances in wartime matches, and would ultimately curtail his career. After the war, Bastin, by now in his thirties, would only play seven more times, without scoring, before retiring in January 1947.

After retirement, Bastin returned to his native Exeter and ran a pub. He died in 1991 at the age of 79. A stand at St James Park, Exeter's home ground, is named in his honour and in 2009 he was inducted into the English Football Hall of Fame.

Personal life
Bastin married Joan L. Shaul at Hendon, North London, in 1939. She outlived him by just over 20 years, dying in April 2012 at the age of 96. They had two daughters, Patricia and Barbara.

Honours
Arsenal
 First Division: 1930–31, 1932–33, 1933–34, 1934–35, 1937–38
 FA Cup: 1929–30, 1935–36
 FA Charity Shield: 1930, 1931, 1933, 1934, 1938

Individual
 English Football Hall of Fame Inductee
 Exeter City Hall of fame Inductee

References

External links
Arsenal.com Profile

1912 births
1991 deaths
Sportspeople from Exeter
Footballers from Devon
Deaf association football players
English footballers
Association football forwards
England international footballers
Exeter City F.C. players
Arsenal F.C. players
Watford F.C. wartime guest players
English Football League players
English Football Hall of Fame inductees
English Football League representative players
English deaf people
Civil Defence Service personnel
FA Cup Final players